Metamorphosis is a rerelease of Zero Hour's eponymous debut album.

Track listing
"Eyes of Denial" – 4:42
"The System Remains" – 7:22
"Rebirth" – 5:49
"Voice of Reason" – 8:40
"A Passage" – 2:25
"I. Descent" – 3:45
"II. Awaken" – 4:33
"III. Union" – 5:44
"IV. Solace" – 1:03
"V. Ascent" – 2:01
"Eyes of Denial" (Demo Version) – 3:57
"Jaded Eyes" (Demo Version) – 3:29

Personnel
 Erik Rosvold – vocals
 Jasun Tipton – guitars
 Troy Tipton – Bass
 Mike Guy – drums
 Matt Guillory – keyboards
 Phillip Bennett – keyboards
 Brittany Tipton – Female vocals

2003 albums
Albums with cover art by Travis Smith (artist)
Zero Hour (band) albums